Avinurme is a small borough in Mustvee Parish Jõgeva County northeastern Estonia. It was the administrative centre of Avinurme Parish.

Singer Dagmar Oja was born in Avinurme in 1981.

References

Boroughs and small boroughs in Estonia
Kreis Dorpat